William Carruthers Cunningham (22 February 1925 – 27 November 2000) was a Scottish footballer who played in both Scotland and England.

Born in Hill of Beath, Fife, Cunningham began his career as a centre half with Dunfermline Athletic, combining part-time football with a mining job in the local colliery. He moved to Airdrieonians along with Willie Kelly and scored 9 goals in 93 appearances for the Diamonds before a £5,000 fee took him south to Preston North End on 28 June 1949.

Cunningham had by this stage converted to playing as a full-back and made his North End debut against Grimsby Town at Deepdale on 24 August 1949. 12 years later he made his four hundredth league appearance in a goalless draw against Bolton Wanderers on 18 April 1961, the last of the 1953–54 Cup Final team still playing for the club.

Cunningham was capped eight times for his native Scotland – including captaining the side during the 1954 World Cup finals. On leaving Preston in 1963 he had a brief spell as player/manager at Southport before returning to Deepdale as Reserve Team trainer.

See also
List of Scotland national football team captains

References

External links
 
 International appearances at londonhearts.com Scotland section

1925 births
2000 deaths
Dunfermline Athletic F.C. players
Airdrieonians F.C. (1878) players
Preston North End F.C. players
Southport F.C. players
Scottish footballers
Scotland international footballers
Scottish football managers
Southport F.C. managers
1954 FIFA World Cup players
Scotland B international footballers
Footballers from Fife
Scottish Football League players
English Football League players
Association football fullbacks
People from Hill of Beath
People educated at Beath High School
Scottish Junior Football Association players
Crossgates Primrose F.C. players
FA Cup Final players